Kiril Yordanov (born June 14, 1956) is the former mayor of Varna, the third-largest city in Bulgaria. He held the post from 1999 to 6 March 2013 as an independent when he was forced to step down after the anti-corruption protests involving even the self-immolation of one of the protesters Plamen Goranov.
Yordanov was born in Varna, and graduated from the University of Sofia in 1982 with a degree in law.
He worked in Varna Province Court from 1984 to 1991. From 1991 to 1997 he was governor of Varna Province (oblast). He is married and has one child. It is believed that he was controlled by the crime organization - TIM

See also 
 2013 Bulgarian protests
 Plamen Goranov
 2013 Bulgarian parliamentary election

External links
 Кирил Йорданов

Living people
1956 births
Politicians from Varna, Bulgaria
Mayors of places in Bulgaria